SPECS is a sports company from Indonesia. The company was founded in 1994 in Jakarta. The company produces a wide range of sports equipment. The company is known for sponsoring Indonesian association football players and is a shirt club sponsor in the Liga 1.

Sponsorships

Teams

National Teams

Asia

Club Teams 
 Electric PLN
  Permata Indah FC
 IPC Pelindo
  Persipura Jayapura 
 Bhayangkara FC
  Bali United F.C.

Players

 Bambang Bayu Saptaji
 Tely Sarendra
 Socrates Matulessy
 Yos Adi Wicaksono
 Randy Satria Mushar
 Ardiyansyah Runtuboy
 Caisar Silitonga
  Fadilah Nurrahman
  Andre Oktaviansyah
  Amanar Abdillah
  Yudha Febrian
  Fajar Fathurrahman
  Cristian Gonzáles
  Bayu Gatra
  Samsul Arif
  Adam Alis
  Kurnia Meiga
  Ilham Udin
  Paulo Sitanggang
  Maldini Pali
  Wawan Hendrawan
  Marc Klok
  Asnawi Mangkualam
  Sani Rizki
  Ravi Murdianto
  Rendi Irwan
  Ardi Idrus
  Osas Saha
  Riko Simanjuntak
  Ismed Sofyan
  Maman Abdurrahman
  Henhen Herdiana
  Hanis Saghara Putra
  Dedik Setiawan
  Alsan Sanda
  Jaimerson Xavier 
  Wiljan Pluim

Slogans
 Melejit Ke Sasaran (1994-1996, English: Soaring to the target)
 Spektakuler Adalah Specs (1996-2000, English: Spectacular is Specs)
 Tampil Lebih Spektakuler (1996-2000, English: Show more Spectacular)
 We Are Sports (2000–present)

Companies established in 1994
Indonesian brands
Sportswear brands
Manufacturing companies based in Jakarta

External links
 Official Website